Arızlar is a village in the Sandıklı District, Afyonkarahisar Province, Turkey. Its population is 231 (2021).

Infrastructure information 
The village has a primary school, but can not be used. The village has drinking water supply, but there is no sewerage system. There are Post Office branches, but no post office. There is no health centers and health posts. The village is asphalt roads connecting the village has electricity and landline telephone.

Economy 
The village economy is based on agriculture and animal husbandry.

Population 
Rural population data by years

References

Villages in Sandıklı District